Özdemir Asaf (11 June 1923, Ankara - 28 January 1981, Istanbul) was one of the prominent Turkish poets during the early Republican period.

Biography

Life 
He was born on 11 June 1923 in Ankara. His real name is Halit Özdemir Arun. His father, Mehmet Asaf, is one of the founders of the Council of State. In 1930, the year his father died, he entered the first part of Galatasaray High School. In 1941, in the 11th grade, he went to Kabataş High School for Boys with an additional exam and graduated in 1942. He attended the Faculty of Law, the Faculty of Economics (until the 3rd grade), and the Faculty of Journalism for one year. Meanwhile, he worked for Tanin and Zaman newspapers and made translations.

Career 
His first article published in Servet-i Fünun (Uyanış) magazine. He is founder of Sanat Basımevi (1951) and published his books under the name of Yuvarlak Masa Yayınları. He became one of the founders of the Temel Hakları Yaşatma Derneği (Fundamental Rights Survival Association), which was founded in 1962 under the leadership of Mehmet Ali Aybar.

Together with Attila İlhan, he was the most loved poet of the literary matinees, which was the favorite activity of the 1950s. Özdemir Asaf, who visited the coastal cities of the Atlantic and the east of America in 1954, traveled almost all of Europe, starting from Lapland in 1959. In 1966, at the invitation of the Macedonian Writer's Union, he went to Yugoslavia and participated in the poetry congress.

Bibliography

Poems 

 Dünya Kaçtı Gözüme - 1955
 Sen Sen Sen - 1956
 Bir Kapı Önünde - 1957
 Yumuşaklıklar Değil - 1962
 Nasılsın - 1970
 Çiçekleri Yemeyin - 1975
 Ben Değildim - 1978
 Bugün ve Bugün (Yayımlanmamış şiirler) - 1984
 Benden Sonra Mutluluk (Yayımlanmamış şiirler)
 Çiçek Senfonisi (Toplu şiirler) - 2008
 Sen Bana Bakma, Ben Senin Baktığın Yönde Olurum  - 2012
 Yalnızlığa Övgü (Yalnızlık Paylaşılmaz)
 Lavinia

Ethica 

 Yuvarlağın Köşeleri - 1961
 Yuvarlağın Köşeleri-2 - 1988

Story 

 Dün Yağmur Yağacak  - 1987

Essay 

 Özdemir Asaf'ça  - 1988

Translations 

 Reading Zindanı Baladı (Oscar Wilde) - 1968

Seçme Şiirler

A poem of Özdemir Asaf  - Lavinia (1957)

References 
 

 

1923 births
1981 deaths
Writers from Istanbul
Burials at Aşiyan Asri Cemetery